Ponyrovsky District is an administrative and municipal district (raion), one of the twenty-eight in Kursk Oblast, Russia. It is located in the north of the oblast. Its administrative center is the urban locality (a work settlement) of Ponyri. Population:  13,553 (2002 Census);  The population of Ponyri accounts for 45.1% of the district's total population.

Geography
Ponyrovsky District is located in the north central region of Kursk Oblast, on the border with Oryol Oblast.  The terrain is hilly plain on the Orel-Kursk plateau of the Central Russian Upland.  The district is 45 km north of the city of Kursk and 400 km southwest of Moscow.  The area measures 25 km (north-south), and 35 km (west-east).  The administrative center is the town of Ponyri.

The district is bordered on the north by Oryol Oblast, on the southeast by Zolotukhinsky District, and on the west by Fatezhsky District.

References

Notes

Sources

External links
Ponyrovsky District on Google Maps
Ponyrovsky District on OpenStreetMap

Districts of Kursk Oblast